The Estádio do Chiveve is a multi-purpose stadium in Beira, Mozambique.  It is currently used mostly for football matches and is the home stadium of Clube Ferroviário da Beira.  The stadium holds 7,000 people.

External links
 Picture of the Estádio do Ferroviário

Ferroviario
Buildings and structures in Beira, Mozambique
Multi-purpose stadiums in Mozambique
Buildings and structures in Sofala Province